Dog Hollow is a valley in the U.S. state of West Virginia.

The fox hounds of a local settler caused the name Dog Hollow to be selected.

References

Landforms of Jackson County, West Virginia
Valleys of West Virginia